The 1927 Fordham Rams football team was an American football team that represented Fordham University as an independent during the 1927 college football season. In its first year under head coach Frank Cavanaugh, Fordham compiled a 3–5 record and outscored opponents by a total of 139 to 82. He hired Tony Comerford as an assistant coach, who had worked with him in that capacity in the prior year for Boston College. William Feaster was the team captain.

Schedule

References

Fordham
Fordham Rams football seasons
Fordham Rams football